Richard Frank Hyland (July 26, 1900 – July 16, 1981) was an American rugby union player who competed in the 1924 Summer Olympics. He was a member of the American rugby union team, which won the gold medal.

Hyland also played college football at Stanford University, and went on to become a sportswriter for the Los Angeles Times.

References

1900 births
1981 deaths
American rugby union players
Stanford Cardinal football players
Rugby union players at the 1924 Summer Olympics
Olympic gold medalists for the United States in rugby
United States international rugby union players
20th-century American non-fiction writers
American sportswriters
Medalists at the 1924 Summer Olympics